is a Japanese instructor of Shotokan karate.
He has won the JKA's version of the world championships for kumite on 2 occasions. He has also won the JKA All-Japan championships for kumite on 2 occasions.
He is currently an instructor of the Japan Karate Association.

Biography

Koji Ogata was born in Kyoto, Japan on 21 October 1968. He studied at Toyo University. His karate training began during his 2nd year of elementary school.

Competition
Koji Ogata has had considerable success in karate competition.

Major Tournament Success
51st JKA All Japan Karate Championship (2008) - 3rd Place Kumite
10th Funakoshi Gichin Cup World Karate-do Championship Tournament (Sydney, 2006) - 1st Place Kumite
48th JKA All Japan Karate Championship (2005) - 1st Place Kumite
9th Shoto World Cup Karate Championship Tournament (Tokyo, 2004) - 1st Place Kumite
47th JKA All Japan Karate Championship (2004) - 3rd Place Kumite
46th JKA All Japan Karate Championship (2003) - 1st Place Kumite
45th JKA All Japan Karate Championship (2002) - 3rd Place Kumite
44th JKA All Japan Karate Championship (2001) - 2nd Place Kumite
8th Shoto World Cup Karate Championship Tournament (Tokyo, 2000) - 3rd Place Kumite
7th Shoto World Cup Karate Championship Tournament (Paris, 1998) - 2nd Place Kumite
40th JKA All Japan Karate Championship (1997) - 3rd Place Kumite

References

 

1968 births
Japanese male karateka
Karate coaches
Shotokan practitioners
Sportspeople from Kyoto Prefecture
Sportspeople from Kyoto
Toyo University alumni
Living people